The 2012 FKF President's Cup was the 41st season of Kenya's top domestic cup competition. The deadline for application was 30 July, and 32 clubs had registered for participation to the tournament after paying a mandatory KSh.15,000/= fee, with a final list of 34 teams. The quarter-finals were played on 6−7 October, while the semi-finals and the final were played on 17−18 November and 21 November respectively, after the end of the 2012 Kenyan Premier League.

Two teams were to be knocked out in the first round (playoff matches) to decide who would advance to the second round.

By winning the tournament, Gor Mahia earned a place in the preliminary round of the 2013 CAF Confederation Cup, and will play Tusker, the winners of the 2012 Kenyan Premier League, at the 2013 Kenyan Super Cup.

Teams
The following is the final list of teams that participated in the tournament.

First round
Playoff matches in the first round between Muranga United, Maua United, Taqwa and Tetu Stars were played to decide who would advance to the second round.

Murang'a United were awarded a walkover as Maua United withdrew from the tournament.

Taqwa were knocked out of the tournament due to "technicalities".

Bracket
The FKF decided to change the quarter-final fixtures, meaning that A.F.C. Leopards and Kenya Revenue Authority were now to face Karuturi Sports and Sofapaka respectively.

Second round
The draw for the second round of matches was held on 30 July 2012 and ties were played from 4 August to 12 August. Having been beaten, Malindi United, Bidco United, MOYAS and Shabana Kisii still withdrew from the tournament.

Third round
The third round of matches was played on the weekend of 1−2 September in various venues, all at 15:00 UTC+3 time.

Quarter-finals
The quarter-finals were played on the weekend of 6–7 October. The FKF changed two of the fixtures for the round, meaning that A.F.C. Leopards and K.R.A. were now to meet Karuturi Sports and Sofapaka respectively. The decision raised many eyebrows as questions arose regarding the true motive behind the FKF's decision.

Semi-finals
The semi-finals are being played on the weekend of 17–18 November. They were to be played on the weekend on 20–21 October, but the dates were pushed so as not to clash with the Kenyan Premier League schedule.

Final
The final was played on 20 November at the Nyayo National Stadium. Gor Mahia won 3–0 on penalties to win the title a record 10th time.

Top goalscorers

See also
 2012 Kenyan Premier League
 2012 Kenyan Super Cup

References

External links
 2012 FKF President's Cup at Futaa.com

FKF President's Cup seasons
2012 in Kenyan football
2011–12 domestic association football cups
2012–13 domestic association football cups